Lina Vladimirovna Krasnoroutskaya (born 29 April 1984) is a retired tennis player. She is a former junior world No. 1 (1999), and in addition, she won the US Open junior title. Krasnoroutskaya, however, had a career blighted by injury.

Tennis career
After a successful year in 2001, when she reached the quarterfinals at Roland Garros (seventh youngest player ever to do so) and the Wimbledon last 16, as the world No. 34, she was badly injured at the 2002 Australian Open when she obtained an invite from Hong Kong Tennis Patrons' Association to play the Hong Kong Ladies Challenge after. She was not effectively back until February 2003 when she climbed back up the rankings (reached 25th) after wins over Monica Seles, Elena Bovina, Nadia Petrova and then-world No. 1, Kim Clijsters.

However, a shoulder injury at the end of 2003, then a liver condition in 2004, followed by stomach problems at the start of 2005 meant that she had considered (March 2005) whether to continue on the pro tour. In June 2005, she announced she would be returning, but that the return would be delayed until after the birth of her first baby in November 2005.

Despite her injuries, she has earned almost $1 million in prize money, has represented her country at both junior and senior level, reached a WTA Tier I final in Canada (2003), a semifinal appearance at Wimbledon in the doubles with Elena Dementieva (having beaten the Williams sisters on centre court in the third round) and runner-up at the US Open in 2003 in the mixed-doubles with Daniel Nestor, who had three match points.

She is a commentator on Russian TV, for NTV Plus.

Grand Slam finals

Mixed doubles: 1 runner-up

WTA career finals

Singles: 1 runner-up

Doubles: 3 (1–2)

ITF finals

Singles (1–0)

Doubles (0–2)

Grand Slam singles performance timeline

External links
 
 
 

1984 births
Living people
People from Obninsk
Russian female tennis players
US Open (tennis) junior champions
Grand Slam (tennis) champions in girls' singles
Sportspeople from Kaluga Oblast